Peter Gilliver (born 14 June 1964) is a lexicographer and associate editor of the Oxford English Dictionary.

Career

Gilliver's parents were both linguists. He attended Barnard Castle School, and has a degree in Mathematics from Jesus College, Cambridge, and a qualification in Information Science from Liverpool.

As of 2013, he was responsible for the largest three or four entries in the current electronic revision, including the largest (that for "run", which took him over 9 months and has 645 meanings for the verb form alone).

In 2016 Gilliver published a history of the OED, which took most of the previous decade to write.

He and his partner sing in various choirs, including the Oxford Bach Choir (which they came to administer by 2021), and Fiori Musicali.

Credits

Television

Publications

See also 
Oxford English Dictionary
John Simpson (lexicographer)
Edmund Weiner

References

External links 
 (video) 14th stop: Newcastle: A different English accent - a discussion on regional accents (and whether they get into the OED) [2019-11-17: link no longer functional; archived version substituted]
 
 Icons article on Peter Gilliver [no longer links to relevant content, as of 2013 - but link is now to archived version, so OK]

British lexicographers
1964 births
Alumni of Jesus College, Cambridge
Alumni of the University of Sheffield
Tolkien Society members
Living people
Tolkien studies